Little Weighton railway station was a station on the Hull and Barnsley Railway, and served the village of Little Weighton in the East Riding of Yorkshire, England.

The station opened on 27 July 1885, closed to passengers on 1 August 1955 and closed completely on 6 July 1964.

References

External links
 
 Little Weighton station on navigable 1947 O. S. map

Disused railway stations in the East Riding of Yorkshire
Railway stations in Great Britain opened in 1885
Railway stations in Great Britain closed in 1955
Former Hull and Barnsley Railway stations